Convoy QP 1 was an Arctic convoy of the PQ/QP series which ran during the Second World War. 
It was one of a series of convoys run to return Allied ships from Soviet northern ports to home ports in Britain.
It sailed in late September 1941, reaching Allied ports in mid-October. All ships arrived safely.

Background
In August 1941 Britain had run a convoy of military supplies to Archangel in Northern Russia to support the Soviets in resisting the German invasion of June 1941. 
This operation, codenamed Dervish, had been a success, leading to the inauguration of a monthly convoy cycle of supply ships; the PQ convoys taking supplies and war materiel to Russia, and the simultaneous QP convoys returning the empty ships. 
PQ 1, comprising 10 ships, left Iceland on 28 September, while QP 1, made up of the seven Dervish ships, and seven Soviet freighters, left Archangel the same day.

Ships
QP 1 comprised 14 merchant ships: These were the seven vessels (one Dutch and six British merchants that made up the Dervish convoy, now unloaded and sailing in ballast, and seven Soviet ships carrying trade goods (mainly timber) for the western allies. The Convoy Commodore was, as before, Capt. John Dowding RNR in Llanstephan Castle.
The ocean escort comprised the destroyer  and the three ASW trawlers which had escorted the Dervish ships; these were accompanied by the cruiser  and destroyer , which had arrived the previous day with a British and an American diplomatic mission, and RAF personnel.
Local escort was provided by three Royal Navy minesweepers that had escorted Dervish, and were now stationed in North Russia for this purpose.

Distant cover was provided by units of the Home Fleet, which were engaged in Operation EJ, a series of air strikes on targets in occupied Norway.

Voyage
QP 1 departed Archangel on 28 September 1941, accompanied by the local escort, which returned to Archangel after two days. On 2 October London detached for a fast independent transit to Scapa Flow, and was replaced by the cruiser . On 4 October the oiler  joined the convoy, escorted by the destroyer . On 5 October the trawler Ophelia developed mechanical problems and was towed by Active to Iceland. Two Soviet freighters (one of which, Sukhona, was over 20 years old and referred to by Electras crew as 'Smokey Joe') were unable to keep up and dropped out of the convoy; both arrived safely after an independent voyage.

On 8 October aircraft from the carrier  attacked shipping and other targets along the coast of Vestfjord. Several ships were hit, and in the absence of any response from the Luftwaffe, all aircraft returned safely.

There was no interference by German forces and QP 1 arrived in Scapa Flow without harm on 10 October.

Ships involved
QP sailed from Archangel on 28 September and arrived at Scapa Flow on 10 October. It comprised 14 merchant ships and 11 escorts, though not all were present at one time.

Notes

References
 TJ Cain, A Sellwood: HMS Electra (1976) 
 Paul Kemp : Convoy! Drama in Arctic Waters (1993) 
 Bob Ruegg, Arnold Hague : Convoys to Russia (1992) 
 Stephen Roskill, The War at Sea 1939-1945 Vol I (1954) HMSO (ISBN none)

External links
 QP 1 at Convoyweb

QP 1